The 2015–16 season was Associazione Sportiva Roma's 88th in existence and 87th season in the top flight of Italian football. The team began the season competing in Serie A, the Coppa Italia, and the Champions League, but were knocked out in the Round of 16 in the latter two competitions. After a run of 14 wins and 3 draws in their last 17 games Roma managed to finish third, qualifying for the play-off round of the 2016–17 UEFA Champions League.

French coach Rudi Garcia began the season as Roma's manager for the third consecutive campaign, but was sacked on 13 January after a run of poor results. Former Roma coach Luciano Spalletti, who was at the club from 2005 to 2009, was hired to replace Garcia.

Players

Squad information
Last updated on 14 May 2016
Appearances include league matches only

Roma Primavera

Transfers

In

Loans in

Total spending:  €42,600,000

Out

Loans out

Total income:  €88,650,000
Net income:  €48,250,000

Pre-season and friendlies

Competitions

Overall

Last updated: 14 May 2016

Serie A

League table

Results summary

Results by round

Matches

Coppa Italia

UEFA Champions League

Group stage

Knockout phase

Round of 16

Statistics

Appearances and goals

|-
! colspan=14 style="background:#B21B1C; color:#FFD700; text-align:center"| Goalkeepers

|-
! colspan=14 style="background:#B21B1C; color:#FFD700; text-align:center"| Defenders

|-
! colspan=14 style="background:#B21B1C; color:#FFD700; text-align:center"| Midfielders

|-
! colspan=14 style="background:#B21B1C; color:#FFD700; text-align:center"| Forwards

|-
! colspan=14 style="background:#B21B1C; color:#FFD700; text-align:center"| Players transferred out during the season

Goalscorers

Last updated: 14 May 2016

Clean sheets

Last updated: 14 May 2016

Disciplinary record

Last updated: 14 May 2016

References

A.S. Roma seasons
Roma
Roma